Sierra Nevada is a stratovolcano located in the La Araucanía Region of Chile, near the Llaima volcano. Its last certain eruptions were in the Pleistocene period, but its activity may extend into the Holocene. Its primary lavas are andesitic and basaltic flows, although it has also produced pyroclastic flows. Lahars are also a hazard of this volcano. This stratovolcano is located in Conguillío National Park.

See also
 List of volcanoes in Chile

Sources
  (in Spanish; also includes volcanoes of Argentina, Bolivia, and Peru)

External links

Stratovolcanoes of Chile
Subduction volcanoes
Mountains of Chile
Volcanoes of Araucanía Region
Pleistocene stratovolcanoes